Louise is a town in Humphreys County, Mississippi. The population was 199 at the 2010 census, down from 315 at the 2000 census.

History
On July 15, 1919, Black veteran Robert Truett was lynched as part of the Red Summer of 1919.

William "Willie" Sklar served as alderman and later mayor for three terms. Sklar was a Jewish immigrant who came to Louise in search of the American dream. 

Hoover Lee, a long-time citizen, businessman, and government official, resides here. His "Hoover Sauce" marinade/BBQ sauce is nationally renowned. On September 19, 2007, Chris Talbott of the Associated Press featured him in a nationwide article. He has been noted in Delta, Southern Living, and Y'all magazines, and recently mentioned in the publication "Wild Abundance", a cookbook anthology, compiled by hunters from numerous hunting clubs from the South.

Geography
Louise is located in southern Humphreys County along Silver Creek in the Mississippi Delta region. Mississippi Highway 149 passes just east of the town, leading north  to U.S. Route 49W at Silver City and south  via Mississippi Highway 16 to Yazoo City.

Demographics

As of the census of 2000, 315 people, 117 households, and 80 families resided in the town. The population density was 1,898.5 people per square mile (715.4/km). The 125 housing units averaged 753.4 per square mile (283.9/km). The racial makeup of the town was 54.29% African American, 44.13% White and 1.59% Asian. Hispanic or Latino people of any race were 0.32% of the population.

Of the 117 households, 25.6% had children under the age of 18 living with them, 45.3% were married couples living together, 21.4% had a female householder with no husband present, and 30.8% were not families. About 24.8% of all households were made up of individuals, and 11.1% had someone living alone who was 65 years of age or older. The average household size was 2.69 and the average family size was 3.28.

In the town, the population was distributed as 26.3% under the age of 18, 8.9% from 18 to 24, 26.0% from 25 to 44, 24.8% from 45 to 64, and 14.0% who were 65 years of age or older. The median age was 34 years. For every 100 females, there were 88.6 males. For every 100 females age 18 and over, there were 75.8 males.

The median income for a household in the town was $28,750, and for a family was $31,875. Males had a median income of $25,625 versus $22,500 for females. The per capita income for the town was $14,658. About 14.0% of families and 13.2% of the population were below the poverty line, including 15.9% of those under age 18 and 40.4% of those age 65 or over.

The per capita income for Humphreys County is $10,926 and ranked 76 of 82 counties. The per capita income for Louise, Mississippi, is $14,658 and ranked 129 of 329 places listed in Mississippi.

Economy
Louise is mostly an agricultural community. One of the biggest farms is Seward and Son Planting Company.

Government
The current mayor of Louise is Thomas Ruffin Smith. Previously serving as interim mayor, he was elected on June 2, 2009, for a four-year term. Former mayors of Louise have been Howard Webb, Hoover Lee, D.G. Rutledge, L.D. Schoonover, and the above-mentioned William Sklar.

Education
The town of Louise is served by the Humphreys County School District.

Notable people
 Houston Antwine, former professional football player
 Leon Finney Jr., minister and community organizer
 Hip Linkchain, Chicago blues guitarist
 James D. Montgomery, attorney
 Warren Smith, rockabilly singer

References

Towns in Humphreys County, Mississippi
Towns in Mississippi